Deola is a taluka of Nashik district in Maharashtra, India.
It is weekly market for surrounding Villages. Economy of this town is primarily run on agriculture.

Deola is situated on the confluence of the rivers Kolti and Bhawdi. It comes under dindori lok sabha constituency and chandwad vidhan sabha constituency. The town lies on the State highway Vinchur-Prakasha SH-07.

Paanch Kandil (City square with five lamps) is located at the centre of the town where citizens hang out during leisure times. Famous eateries and tangy chat shacks line the Paanch kadil chowk. Saraf Bazar (Gold market), Subhash Road, Tilak Road are some of the market places in Deola. Vegetable market lies adjacent to the river bridge.

Recently, in 2015, the town was upgraded from Gram Panchayat to Municipal Council.

Education 
The town has notable schools like Karmaveer Ramraoji Aher School & Junior College, Shardadevi Dnyan Vikas Mandir, Tirupati Valley English Medium School, SKD International School.

Up to post graduation level education is available in Deola.

Public Transportation 
Buses are frequently available to go to Mumbai, Pune, Nashik and nearby towns.

Apart from buses, private cabs commonly famous as Kali-Peeli (Black & yellow colored cabs) ply to the nearby places like Chandwad, Kalwan, Satana & Malegaon.

Agricultural produce 

Onion, tomato, pomegranate, bajra and maize continue to be the major crops grown in Deola. However, farmers are experimenting to encash more money with modern agricultural practices with grapes and sugarcane too.

APMC is market is located in the town for trading agricultural produce.

Languages 
Languages to be spoken are Ahirani and Marathi.

Ahirani is a regional lingo derived from Marathi and Gujarati.

Cities and towns in Nashik district
Talukas in Maharashtra